Chris Pfau is a former American soccer player who played in the NPSL.

Career statistics

Club

Notes

References

Living people
American soccer players
Association football forwards
Canton Invaders players
Dayton Dynamo players
Cincinnati Silverbacks players
Cincinnati Riverhawks players
National Professional Soccer League (1984–2001) players
A-League (1995–2004) players
Year of birth missing (living people)